Viera Ellong Doualla (born 14 June 1987) is a footballer who plays as a midfielder for Equatorial Guinean Liga Nacional club Futuro Kings FC. Born and raised in Cameron, he was a member of the Equatorial Guinea national team at the 2012 Africa Cup of Nations.

International career
Among the frameworks of Equatorial Guinea national football team players, is certainly Viera Ellong Doualla, born from Cameroonian parents, this 27-year-old midfielder was the first Cameroonian to seek his professional career in the Equatorial Guinea neighbor. Even if he lived five years in the country of adoption as required by FIFA's change of sport nationality procedure, it was not necessarily the case in his debut in the Equatorial Guinea national football team.

He was part of the squad at the 2012 Africa Cup of Nations.

International goals
Scores and results list Equatorial Guinea's goal tally first.

References

External links
World Soccer Article

1987 births
Living people
Association football midfielders
Equatoguinean footballers
Equatorial Guinea international footballers
Cameroonian footballers
Footballers from Douala
Mount Cameroon F.C. players
PAE Kerkyra players
Cameroonian expatriate footballers
Cameroonian expatriate sportspeople in Gabon
Expatriate footballers in Gabon
Cameroonian expatriate sportspeople in Greece
Expatriate footballers in Greece
Cameroonian emigrants to Equatorial Guinea
Naturalized citizens of Equatorial Guinea
2012 Africa Cup of Nations players
2015 Africa Cup of Nations players
Equatoguinean people of Cameroonian descent
Akonangui FC players
CD Elá Nguema players
Leones Vegetarianos FC players
Futuro Kings FC players